Henie is the surname of:

 Sonja Henie (1912–1969), Norwegian Olympic and world champion figure skater and film star
 Marit Henie (1925–2012), Norwegian figure skater, cousin of Sonja Henie
 Wilhelm Henie (1872–1937), Norwegian track cycling world champion, speed skater and coach and manager of his daughter, Sonja Henie

See also
 Henny, a list of people with the given name or surname
 Hennie, a list of people with the given name, nickname or surname